Friendship is an unincorporated community in Marion County, South Carolina, United States.

St. Paul Baptist Church is located in Friendship.

Herbert Woods, co-founder of Sylvia's Restaurant of Harlem, lived in Friendship as a child.

References

Unincorporated communities in Marion County, South Carolina
Unincorporated communities in South Carolina